Kang Ki-young (born October 14, 1983) is a South Korean actor. He is well-known for his supporting roles in a number of popular Korean dramas.

Filmography

Film

Television series

Variety show

Awards and nominations

References

External links
 

1983 births
Living people
People from Incheon
University of Suwon alumni
21st-century South Korean male actors
South Korean male television actors
South Korean male film actors